Lara's Tower is an adventure for fantasy role-playing games published by Judges Guild in 1981.

Contents
Lara's Tower is a scenario set in a 10-level tower.

Publication history
Lara's Tower was written by Kevin Nunn, and was published by Judges Guild in 1981 as a 16-page book.

Reception

Reviews

References

Judges Guild fantasy role-playing game adventures
Role-playing game supplements introduced in 1981